The 2004 United States House of Representatives election in Wyoming was held on November 2, 2004, to determine who will represent the state of Wyoming in the United States House of Representatives. Wyoming has one, at large district in the House, apportioned according to the 2000 United States Census, due to its low population. Representatives are elected for two-year terms. Incumbent Republican Barbara Cubin won re-election by a margin of 13.4%, a significantly smaller margin than George W. Bush's 39.79% in the concurrent presidential election. 

Ladd carried two counties that fellow Democrat Kerry lost in his presidential bid: Albany and Laramie.

Major candidates

Democratic 
Ted Ladd

Republican 
Barbara Cubin, incumbent U.S. Congresswoman

Results

References 

2004 Wyoming elections
Wyoming
2004